Association de Soccer de Blainville, commonly referred to as A.S. Blainville, is a Canadian semi-professional soccer club based in the Montreal suburb of Blainville, Quebec, that plays in the Première ligue de soccer du Québec. They are the only club to have participated in every season of the PLSQ.

History 

The club was founded in 1986.

Men
In 2012, the semi-professional club was established to play in the newly formed Première ligue de soccer du Québec, a Division III league, as one of the founding members. They had a rivalry with FC Boisbriand, with both clubs being from the Laurentides region, although Boisbriand departed the league after the 2013 season, leaving Blainville as the only team from the region.

In 2016, they captured their first trophy, winning the League Cup by defeating FC Gatineau in the finals. In 2017, they won the league championship and they also defended their League Cup title, winning it for the second consecutive year. They repeated as league champions in 2018 and 2019, thereby being three-time defending champions. On September 30, 2017, AS Blainville clinched a spot in the 2018 Canadian Championship after securing first place in the 2017 Première Ligue de Soccer du Québec and became the first club from the PLSQ to be invited to take part in the Canadian Championship, Canada's highest level domestic soccer competition.

Beginning in 2018, the defending league champion would have the opportunity to participate in the Canadian Championship. In the 2018 Canadian Championship, they defeated League1 Ontario champion Oakville Blue Devils in the first qualifying round. In the second qualifying round, they lost to USL club Ottawa Fury FC. In the 2019 Canadian Championship, they were defeated by Canadian Premier League club York9 FC in the first qualifying round. Due to the COVID-19 pandemic, they were unable to participate in the 2020 edition, with their participation instead shifted to the following year's tournament. They won their fourth consecutive league championship in 2020, after defeating Ottawa South United in the final game of the season before the season was cut short due to the COVID-19 pandemic. In 2022, after a third place finish in the league, AS Blainville won the league cup, Coupe PLSQ, for the third time.

Women
In 2018, they entered a team in the newly formed women's division of the Première Ligue de soccer du Québec. They won their first women's title during the 2020 season, which was shortened due to the COVID-19 pandemic, coming in first place with a perfect 3-0-0 record, in which they did not concede any goals, and defeating CS Fabrose in the championship final. The women defended their league title in 2021, which was played once again played in a shortened season (this year nine matches), contested by a full ten-team league, while also winning the inaugural women's Coupe PLSQ. They won their third consecutive women's league title in 2022, qualifying them for the first ever League1 Canada women's interprovincial championship, and also repeated as Coupe PLSQ champions. The women's team won the inaugural interprovinical title after defeating League1 British Columbia side Varsity FC in the semi-finals, and PLSQ runner-up AS Laval in the final. As champions, they earned automatic qualification to the 2023 edition of the tournament.

Seasons

Men

Women

Notable former players 
The following players have either played at the professional or international level, either before or after playing for the PLSQ team:

Honours 
Men
PLSQ Championship: 2017, 2018, 2019, 2020
 Coupe PLSQ: 2016,  2017, 2022

Women
PLSQ Championship: 2020, 2021, 2022
Coupe PLSQ: 2021, 2022
Interprovincial Championship: 2022

References

External links 
AS Blainville homepage

Association football clubs established in 1986
1986 establishments in Quebec
Blainville
Soccer clubs in Quebec